The Zoli Agency was a modeling agency based in New York City, particularly notable in the 1970s and 1980s.

Background
It was established by a Budapest-born Hungarian designer named Zoltan "Zoli" Rendessy in 1971. It was originally more geared towards male models, and was known as one of the elite male modelling agencies in the 1970s. 

The agency has had a considerable number of celebrities on their books, including Veruschka (signed 1975),  Geena Davis (signed 1979), Vanity and Dolph Lundgren (signed 1983), although his modelling for the company was short lived as he was described as "a bit too tall and muscular for a model's size 40".

In 1981, the legendary documentary filmmaker Frederick Wiseman released the film Model, which was filmed in part at the Zoli Agency. It was screened on PBS.

In 1989, the modeling agency expanded to Miami Beach for the launch of Zoli South.

See also
 List of modeling agencies

References

http://www.zipporah.com/films/20

External links
Zoli archives
Zoli Models New York

Companies based in New York City
Modeling agencies